Ulterior Mixe is a divergent and recently described Mixe language spoken in Mexico.

References

Mixe–Zoque languages